Álvaro Nicolás García Silvera (born 5 October 2000) is a Uruguayan professional footballer who plays as a forward for Peñarol.

Club career
A youth academy graduate of Peñarol, García made his professional debut on 22 May 2021 in a goalless draw against Fénix. On 4 February 2022, he joined Cerro Largo on a season long loan deal.

International career
García is a former Uruguay youth international. He was part of Uruguay squad which finished as runners-up at 2015 South American U-15 Championship.

Career statistics

Club

Honours
Peñarol
 Uruguayan Primera División: 2021

References

External links
 

2000 births
Living people
Association football forwards
Uruguayan footballers
Uruguay youth international footballers
Uruguayan Primera División players
Peñarol players
Cerro Largo F.C. players